Series One of Ninja Warrior UK, a British physical obstacle assault course game show, was aired on ITV during 2015, from 11 to 30 April May. Of the 250 contestants that took part, the series' competition was won by Timothy Shieff. During its broadcast, the series averaged around 3.76 million viewers.

Ratings

References

2015 British television seasons
Ninja Warrior UK